Route 20 is a , two-lane, uncontrolled-access, secondary highway in Prince Edward Island. Its western terminus is at Route 2 and Route 6 in Kensington and its eastern terminus is at Route 6 and Route 8 in New London. The route is located in Prince and Queens counties.

Route description 

The route begins at its western terminus and heads north to Malpeque, where it turns right. It crosses the Baltic River, heads east, crosses the county line, and curves south near French River. It crosses the Southwest River and ends at its eastern terminus.

References 

020
020
020